Caladenia zephyra is a plant in the orchid family Orchidaceae and is endemic to South Australia. It is a ground orchid with a single, densely hairy leaf and a single cream-coloured to very pale yellow flower with blackish glandular hairs on the sepals and petals. It occurs on the Eyre Peninsula but may have a wider distribution.

Description
The leaf is dull green with a purple blotched base. There are six rows of club-shaped, creamy yellow calli along the mid-line of the labellum. Flowering occurs in late August and September.

Taxonomy and naming
This species was first formally described in 2006 by David Jones who gave it the name Arachnorchis zephyra. The type specimen was collected in the Carappee Hill Conservation Park and the description was published in Australian Orchid Research. In 2008 Robert Bates changed the name to Caladenia zephyra and published the change in Journal of the Adelaide Botanic Garden. The specific epithet (zephyra) is a Latin word meaning "west wind", referring to the westerly distribution of the species compared to that of the related and similar C. arenaria.

Distribution and habitat
Caladenia zephyra is only known from the Eyre Peninsula botanical region of South Australia where it grows in mixed Callitris - Allocasuarina woodland, but it may have a more extensive range.

References

zephyra
Endemic orchids of Australia
Orchids of South Australia
Plants described in 2006
Taxa named by David L. Jones (botanist)
Taxa named by Robert John Bates